The Cibi is a Fijian meke of Bauan origin and war dance, generally performed before or after a battle. It came to prominence in the rugby field in 1939 when it was performed by the Fiji national rugby union team before the match. It is also known as Teivovo

Origins
The origins of the cibi date back to the country's warring times with their Pacific neighbours and intertribal warfare. On their return home the warriors heralded their victory by displaying flags - one for every enemy slain. They were met by the women who would sing songs with accompanying gestures. The cibi was meant for open battle to inspire the troops, but it was sung with more vigour when the victorious army returned home to celebrate.

In 1939, when Fiji prepared for its first-ever tour of New Zealand, the captain, Ratu Sir George Cakobau, thought his team should have a war dance to match the All Blacks' haka. He approached Ratu Bola, the high chief of the warrior clan of Navusaradave in Bau, who taught them the Cibi which has been adopted as Fiji's pre-match ritual ever since and went on to become the only team to remain unbeaten on a full tour of New Zealand.

The Cibi

The 'Cibi' had perhaps been used incorrectly though, as the word actually means "a celebration of victory by warriors," whereas 'Bole' is the acceptance of a challenge. For this reason, the Cibi was replaced in 2012 with the new Bole (pronounced mBolay) war cry. The Bole war cry has a lot more energy compared to the Cibi and seems far more fitting for the gruelling match that is about to commence, However, after the 2012 Pacific Nations Rugby Cup, the Cibi returned to be used.

Composed by Ratu Manoa Rasigatale, the Bole is translated as follows:

I'm challenging you to be uprooted, yes, it will be done, let's turn them up side down. 
I'm ready, you think I'm afraid of you, you can't break my defence. 
You're only a hen, I'm the rooster, let's fight and you'll see. 
I don't sleep and will watch you. 
My strength can reach the crushing of the waves. 
I will not be drowned, you think you'll defeat me by drowning? 
Your fence is only made of wawamere creapers, It's easy to untangle. 
I can uproot you, I can uproot you, yes it will be achieved.

See also

 Haka (sports)
 Kailao
 Sipi Tau
 Siva tau

References

 Spoken Fijian: An Intensive Course in Bauan Fijian, with Grammatical Notes and Glossary By Rusiate T. Komaitai, Albert J. Schütz, Contributor Rusiate T Komaitai, Published 1971, Univ of Hawaii Pr, Foreign Language / Dictionaries / Phrase Books,  used for translation

External links

Cibi on YouTube
Pacific Islanders Rugby Teams supporters website

War dances
Fijian culture
Ritual dances
Rugby football culture